Mumbai City FC Reserves and Academy is the reserve side and youth setup of the Indian Super League side Mumbai City FC. As of the 2021-22 season, the reserve team  competes in the Reliance Foundation Development League.

History 
After several seasons of gradual expansion, the I-League announced that its 2nd Division would incorporate the reserve sides of seven of the ten ISL sides for the 2017–18 season, with no right of promotion for the ISL reserve sides. Mumbai City FC elected not take up the opportunity and were one of the three sides not represented. Two years later, Mumbai City were announced to be entering a team in the 2019–20 competition. In 2022, AIFF and FSDL the governing body of Indian Super League announced that they are introducing a new development league to develop country's young players and it was said that the reserve side of each Indian Super League club will participate in this newly introduced reserve league.  From 2021–22 season, the reserve side of Mumbai City participates in this league.

Players

Other players under contract

Honours

Mumbai City U18 
MFA Independence Cup
Champions (1): 2022

Mumbai City U14 
DPDL Mumbai U14
Champions (1): 2023

See also 
 Mumbai City FC

References 

Football clubs in Mumbai
I-League 2nd Division clubs
 
Indian reserve football teams
Football academies in India